Klaus Auhuber (born 18 October 1951 in Landshut) is an ice hockey player who played for the West German national team. He won a bronze medal at the 1976 Winter Olympics.

References

External links
 
 
 
 

1951 births
Living people
Sportspeople from Landshut
EV Landshut players
Ice hockey players at the 1976 Winter Olympics
Ice hockey players at the 1980 Winter Olympics
Olympic bronze medalists for West Germany
Olympic ice hockey players of West Germany
Olympic medalists in ice hockey
West German ice hockey defencemen
Medalists at the 1976 Winter Olympics
German ice hockey defencemen